Clones is a civil parish located in the barony of Clankelly in County Fermanagh, Northern Ireland, and in County Monaghan, Republic of Ireland.

See also
Clones, County Monaghan

References